The Patigi Regatta Fest founded in 1949 but first took place in 1952. It is a Pategi Emirate boating event in Nigeria featuring the boating races, fishing and swimming.

History 
The fest is host at terrain of Niger River in Patigi Beach which was founded by pategi councils leader Ahman Pategi and Etsu Umaru Bologi I in 1950. The fest is an origin, historical significance and tourism which the first event took place in 1952. The event consists the featuring of residents in the bank river of Niger, Kwara and Kogi, the event consists of boat racing at Gbaradogi of the west river bank.

At the time 1920 the settlers at banks lake and river lived there for reasons which the comprises the rivers as worshiping place such as the Gbafu of Gazun at Pategi market. Some of the boat at the time of worship do not move and in the middle bank of Osun river, river Nile in Egypt were meeting place for the worship was found. The rivers in Nupe community was founded by the forefathers with the River Kempe, river Niger and Kaduna river which traders settled for rest like the Muregi, Sunkuso, Sunlati, Nupeko and Pang Ellah in the Niger, Kwara and Kogi had relationship in aspects of fishing, diving to get the biggest fish, alliance and understanding with likes of horse racing known commonly as Dubar combined in the traditional regatta. 

This helps and bring the understanding and cooperation in Nupe people and which the tribal marks clarify the languages. Mostly the settlers there uses the boat as transportation with the regatta of patigi recognition being placed in tourist center unlike the cultural centre, regatta Motel and Regatta Pavilion. Due to the failure in many years participation, in 2004 the governor of Kwara Abuakar Bukola Saraki set a new committee in the Regatta due to the forgetness and dying of the event and as of the unique of it in the country.

References 

Boat races
Cultural festivals in Nigeria
Boat festivals
Kwara State